Hemlock Semiconductor (HSC) is the largest and only producer of hyper-pure polysilicon headquartered in the United States. Founded in 1961, it is owned by Corning Inc. and Shin-Etsu Handotai and named after Hemlock, Michigan, the location of its factory. Its current facilities produce between 30,000 and 35,000 tons of polycrystalline silicon, ranking it among the top five producers worldwide.

Polycrystalline silicon, also called polysilicon, is a high purity, polycrystalline form of silicon, used as a raw material by the solar photovoltaic and electronics industry.

Former Tennessee facility
The company expanded with the Japanese joint venture partners Shin-Etsu Chemical and Mitsubishi Materials, for a new $1.2 billion plant opening near Clarksville, Tennessee. Though it officially opened in 2012, chemicals were never inventoried and no product was made. The plant was under negotiations in 2011 for a further $3 billion expansion, to keep pace with manufacturing competition from China.

In December 2014, Hemlock Semiconductor announced the permanent closure of the $1.2 billion Tennessee plant, due to adverse conditions from industry oversupply and ongoing challenges from global trade disputes. Many of the approximately fifty employees in Tennessee were offered employment positions in Michigan at the Hemlock, Michigan site or Dow Corning facilities, and the rest received severance packages.

In December 2015, Google announced that they will buy the facility, and invest more than $600 million to turn it into their 15th datacenter.

End of Dow Corning joint venture
Dow Corning announced that June 1, 2016 would be "day one" such that  Dow Chemical Company will assume 100% ownership of the Dow Corning Corporation, concluding the 73-year joint venture between Dow Chemical and Corning Inc.

Hemlock Semiconductor continues as an independently run entity with two shareholders: Corning Inc. owns 80.5%, and Shin-Etsu Chemical owns 19.5%.

Acquisitions 
In September 2020, Hemlock announced they had acquired DuPont’s trichlorosilane (TCS) business, which includes the TCS manufacturing facility in Midland, Michigan.

See also
Dow Corning Corporation — joint venture.
Corning Inc.
Dow Chemical Company
Shin-Etsu Chemical
Official website

References

Semiconductor companies of the United States
Silicon wafer producers
Manufacturing companies based in Michigan
Corning Inc.
Dow Chemical Company
Science and technology in Michigan
Economy of Clarksville, Tennessee
Manufacturing companies established in 1961
1961 establishments in Michigan
Defunct manufacturing companies based in Tennessee